Auxvasse Township is one of eighteen townships in Callaway County, Missouri, USA.  As of the 2010 census, its population was 1,000.

History
Historical references to Auxvasse Township are complicated by the fact that, at the time of its founding on February 12, 1821, the Township was about 4 times larger than it is now, and included all of Callaway County east of Auxvasse Creek. The township as well as the city of Auxvasse are both named after Auxvasse Creek.  Today's city of Auxvasse is not within today's borders of Auxvasse Township, although the city was near the northwest border of the Auxvasse Township of the early 1800s, which extended all the way north to what is now the Audrain-Callaway county line. Auxvasse Township was reduced gradually to its current size by 1826, first by the creation of (then larger and including Shamrock, Calwood, and part of Jackson) Nine Mile Prairie Township to the north of current boundaries. The city of Auxvasse is located about 15 miles to the north-northwest of Auxvasse Township, and about 3 miles from Callaway County's northern border with Audrain County.

Geography
The historic town of Heilburn bordered Portland. Auxvasse Township contains nine cemeteries: Atterberry, Garrett, Holiness, Lawrence, Liberty, Old Salem, Oliver, Saint Patricks and Washington—and the streams of Eagle Creek, Little Tavern Creek, Logan Camp Branch, Logan Creek, Means Branch, Meyers Branch, Mollie Dozier Chute, Mud Creek and Tavern Creek.

The Missouri River forms its southern border, while to its west is St Aubert Township (incl Mokane), to its northwest is East Fulton Township (incl Fulton), to its north is Nine Mile Prairie Township (incl Williamsburg), and to its east is Montgomery County.  Do not confuse today's Auxvasse Township with city of Auxvasse, Missouri in Jackson Township, about 15 to 20 miles to the north-northwest.

References

 USGS Geographic Names Information System (GNIS)
 Missouri State Library. "History of Callaway County". (St Louis, National Historical Company, 1884).
 Callaway County Place Names 1928-1945: https://web.archive.org/web/20160624071020/http://shsmo.org/manuscripts/ramsay/ramsay_callaway.html

External links
 US-Counties.com
 City-Data.com
 Callaway County, Missouri tourism

Townships in Callaway County, Missouri
Jefferson City metropolitan area
Townships in Missouri